This is a comprehensive discography of The Young Gods, a Swiss industrial/experimental band.

Studio albums

Live albums and compilations

Singles

Music videos

References

 
Discographies of Swiss artists
Rock music group discographies